Leucodecton canescens is a species of lichen in the family Graphidaceae. Found in Sri Lanka, it was formally described as a new species in 2014 by lichenologists Gothamie Weerakoon, Robert Lücking  and Helge Thorsten Lumbsch. The lichen, which has been recorded from several locations in the Central Province, grows in semi-exposed, disturbed areas at high elevations. The specific epithet canescens refers to the grey-coloured cover of the thallus.

Leucodecton canescens has a smooth, grey thallus that is 70–100 μm thick with a thin (5–10 μm) cortex. The ascomata are rounded, immersed in the substrate, and measure 0.2–0.3 mm in diameter. The ascospores are muriform, with dimensions of 25–30 by 10–12 μm. Secondary chemicals present in the lichen include stictic acid, constictic acid, acetylconstictic acid, and hypostictic acid. Leucodecton fissurinum is somewhat similar in morphology, but it has a yellowish thallus and narrower ascomata pores that conceal the disc.

References

Graphidaceae
Lichen species
Lichens of Sri Lanka
Lichens described in 2014
Taxa named by Helge Thorsten Lumbsch
Taxa named by Robert Lücking
Taxa named by Gothamie Weerakoon